Florence Douglas is a Trinidadian former cricketer who played as a bowler. She appeared in three One Day Internationals for Trinidad and Tobago at the 1973 World Cup.

References

External links
 
 

Living people
Date of birth missing (living people)
Year of birth missing (living people)
Trinidad and Tobago women cricketers
West Indian women cricketers